The Standard Occupational Classification (SOC) System is a United States government system of classifying occupations. It is used by U.S. federal government agencies collecting occupational data, enabling comparison of occupations across data sets. It is designed to cover all occupations in which work is performed for pay or profit, reflecting the current occupational structure in the United States. The 2010 SOC includes 840 occupational types.

Users of occupational data include government program managers, industrial and labor relations practitioners, students considering career training, job seekers, vocational training schools, and employers wishing to set salary scales or locate a new plant.

The SOC codes have a hierarchical format, so for example the code "15-0000" refers to occupations in the "Computer and Mathematical Occupations" category, and "15-1130" is a subset for "Software Developers and Programmers".

The SOC does not categorize industries or employers. There are parallel category systems for industries used with SOC data, most commonly NAICS.

Other countries
National variants of the SOC are used by the governments of the United Kingdom, Canada, Spain the Philippines, and Singapore.

Classifications 
 Architecture and engineering occupations
 Arts, design, entertainment, sports, and media occupations
 Building and grounds cleaning and maintenance occupations
 Business and financial operations occupations
 Community and social services occupations
 Computer and mathematical occupations
 Construction and extraction occupations
 Education, training, and library occupations
 Farming, fishing, and forestry occupations
 Food preparation and serving related occupations
 Healthcare practitioners and technical occupations
 Healthcare support occupations
 Installation, maintenance, and repair occupations
 Legal occupations
 Life, physical, and social science occupations
 Management occupations
 Military specific occupations
 Office and administrative support occupations
 Personal care and service occupations
 Production occupations
 Protective service occupations
 Sales and related occupations
 Transportation and material moving occupations

History 
The SOC was established in 1977, and revised by a committee representing specialists from across U.S. government agencies in the 1990s.  SOC codes were updated again in 2010, and on November 28, 2017, the Office of Management and Budget (OMB) published a Federal Register notice detailing the final decisions for the 2018 SOC.

See also 
 Designation of workers by collar color
 Dictionary of Occupational Titles (DOT) First Published 1938.  Last complete update 1977.  Last revised edition published (DOT, 4th ed.) in 1991.  Now out of print, the DOT is used by Administrative Law Judges (as required by statute) to encode physical requirements of occupations to make Occupational Law determinations, and for research using its detail over the period covered.
 International Standard Classification of Occupations
 National Occupational Classification (NOC) (in Canada)
 Occupational Information Network (O*NET) Comprehensive information based largely on input from individuals who have personally performed over 970 'data-level' occupational categories; taxonomic information about 40 'non-data-level' categories (970+ 40 = a total of 1010 occupations); includes 840 SOC categories and many specialized O*NET-SOC categories.
 Occupational Outlook Handbook (OOH) Created and maintained by the U.S. Bureau of Labor Statistics (BLS)

References 

 U.S. Department of Labor (2000). Standard Occupational Classification (SOC) Manual (2000 ed.). Washington, D.C.

External links 
 The Standard Occupational Classification (SOC) System

Occupations
Employment classifications